The Guadeloupe national futsal team is controlled by the Ligue Guadeloupéenne de Football, the governing body for futsal in Guadeloupe and represents the country in international futsal competitions, such as the CONCACAF Championships.

Tournaments

CONCACAF Futsal Championship
 1996 - did not qualify
 2000 - did not qualify
 2004 - did not qualify
 2008 - did not qualify
 2012 - did not qualify
 2016 - did not qualify

References

External links
Guadeloupe  at CONCACAF.com

Guadeloupe
F
Futsal in Guadeloupe